Real Mona F.C. is a professional football club based in Mona, Jamaica. They currently that competes in KSAFA Super League, the second tier of Jamaican football. Founded in 1966, the team plays its home matches at the Butter cup park in Mona.

External links
 footballdatabase.eu profile

Football clubs in Jamaica